The Turin Papyrus Map is an ancient Egyptian map, generally considered the oldest surviving map of topographical interest from the ancient world. It is drawn on a papyrus reportedly discovered at Deir el-Medina in Thebes, collected by Bernardino Drovetti (known as Napoleon's Proconsul) in Egypt sometime before 1824 AD and now preserved in Turin's Museo Egizio. The map was drawn about 1150 BC by the well-known Scribe-of-the-Tomb Amennakhte, son of Ipuy. It was prepared for Ramesses IV's quarrying expedition to the Wadi Hammamat in the Eastern Desert, which exposes Precambrian rocks of the Arabian-Nubian Shield. The purpose of the expedition was to obtain blocks of bekhen-stone (metagraywacke sandstone) to be used for statues of the king.

Description 
The map shows a 15-kilometre stretch of Wadi Hammamat and has depictions of this wadi's confluence with wadis Atalla and el-Sid, the surrounding hills, the bekhen-stone quarry, and the gold mine and settlement at Bir Umm Fawakhir. It also includes numerous annotations (written in the hieratic script) identifying the features shown on the map, the destinations of the wadi routes, the distance between the quarry and mine, the location of gold deposits in the hills, and the sizes of the bekhen-stone blocks quarried. The top of the map is toward the south and the source of the Nile River. As currently reconstructed in the Turin Museum, the map measures 2.8 m long by 0.41 m wide. This arrangement of the map fragments is currently considered incorrect however. A new and more accurate reconstruction was proposed by Harrell and Brown in 1992, leading to a reduced length of 2.1 m.

Besides being a topographic map of surprisingly modern aspect, the Turin Papyrus is also a geological map (the earliest known) because it accurately shows the local distribution of different rock types (with black and pink hills), the lithologically diverse wadi gravels (with brown, green and white dots), and it contains information on quarrying and mining. The draughtsman clearly and carefully distributed distinctive features in accordance with the reality of a particular area, adding clarity by the use of legends and contrasting colors. In this respect, the Turin Papyrus may be regarded as the earliest known Geographic Information System.

The location of the map on the ground has been identified and has been shown to be accurate.

The verso of the papyrus is inscribed with unrelated texts, in particular a letter addressed directly to Ramesses VI and pertaining to a cult statue of his setup in the temple of Hathor in Deir el-Medina. The letter asks that a certain man be put in charge of the daily offerings presented to the statue of the king. The request seems to have been granted as the grandson of the author still held the title of "High Priest of Ramesses VI".

The map in origami history 
Among origami (paper folding) enthusiasts, the map has been considered as the earliest known example of folding. According to origami historian David Lister, the map was mentioned by Profs. Koryo Miura (inventor of the Miura fold) and Masamori Sakamaki, from the University of Tokyo, in a meeting of the International Cartographic Association in 1980 as an example of early map folding. However, the vertical creases on the papyrus may not be folding marks, as believed by Miura and Sakamaki. Harrell notes that "The map was rolled up when discovered and subsequently handled, and this explains the especially poor preservation of the rightmost portion in Figure 3, which formed the outer abraded surface of the scroll.".

See also 
 List of ancient Egyptian papyri

References

External links
Prof. Harrell's description of Turin Papyrus, with figures
Turin Museum
Mining in Ancient Egypt
Ancient maps

Maps
Egyptian papyri containing images
Geologic maps
Museo Egizio
19th-century archaeological discoveries
Ramesses IV
Mining in Egypt
History of mining
12th century BC maps